Selenge is one of the 21 aimags (provinces) of Mongolia, located in the north of the country. The name is derived from the Selenge river. The capital is Sükhbaatar.

The province of Darkhan-Uul, and its capital Darkhan, is located as an enclave inside Selenge.

Administrative subdivisions 

* The aimag capital Sükhbaatar.

References 

 
Provinces of Mongolia
States and territories established in 1934
1934 establishments in Mongolia